Vince Beck is a Scottish retired football defender who spent twelve years in the American indoor leagues.

Youth
Born and raised in Scotland, Beck attended Southern Illinois University Edwardsville where he played three games during the 1981 season. In 1983, he resumed his collegiate career at Old Dominion where he played until 1985. He completed his undergraduate degree at Old Dominion in 1997.

Professional
In 1986, Beck turned professional with the Memphis Storm of the American Indoor Soccer Association. He spent three seasons with the Storm and was 1988 First Team All League. In 1990, Beck signed with the Wichita Wings of the Major Indoor Soccer League. Beck spent at least three seasons (1992–1995) with the Dayton Dynamo of the National Professional Soccer League. In 1995, he played for the expansion Cincinnati Silverbacks in the NPSL. In 1996, he spent the outdoor season with the Ohio Xoggz of the USISL. That fall, he signed with the Philadelphia KiXX where he played until 1998. In 2003, he returned to playing with the Memphis Express in the USL Premier Development League.

External links
 MISL stats

References

Living people
1963 births
American Indoor Soccer Association players
Dayton Dynamo players
Cincinnati Silverbacks players
Major Indoor Soccer League (1978–1992) players
Memphis Express (soccer) players
Memphis Storm players
National Professional Soccer League (1984–2001) players
Ohio Xoggz players
Old Dominion Monarchs men's soccer players
SIU Edwardsville Cougars men's soccer players
Philadelphia KiXX players
Scottish footballers
Scottish expatriate footballers
Wichita Wings players
USISL players
Association football defenders
Scottish expatriate sportspeople in the United States
Expatriate soccer players in the United States